Nanminda is a village in Kozhikode district in the state of Kerala, India. Nanminda is also written as "Nanmanda".

Demographics
 India census, Nanmanda had a population of 25,628 with 12,289 males and 13,339 females. The Nanminda Panchayath is situated at Northern side of Chelannur Block in Kozhikode Taluk of Kozhikode District of Kerala in South India.  The area of the panchayath is fully included in Nanminda village. It is located 19 km towards North from District headquarters Kozhikode. 9 km from Chelannur. 407 km from State capital Thiruvananthapuram. Quilandy, Kozhikode, Mavoor, Vadakara are the nearby Cities to Nanminda.

Nanminda is comprising with Nanminda 12th Mile, 13th Mile and 14th Mile. The closest city center to Nanminda is Ballusery also written as "Balluseri". Nanminda Higher Secondary School located at 12th Mile which was established in 1950 is one of the oldest schools across Nanminda.

Nanminda is known for its green paddy fields, coconut farms, areca nut farms, banana plantains, Jack fruit and Mango trees, water falls, lakes, hills and fishing.

In all sections of Agriculture, Animal husbandry, dairy, regional economic development, poverty eradication, health, women empowerment, social justice, SC/ST development are moving in  good progress.   In order to bring the SC/ST colonies into the mainstream many projects are being planned.

Suburbs and villages
 Karakkunnath, Koolippoyil and Ambalapoyil
 Nanmanda 12, Nanmanda 13 and Nanmanda 14
 Poyil thazham, Balabhodhini, Nanminda madu

Important landmarks
 Panyamvalli Varyam Madom Vishnu Kshethram, Nanminda
 Thali Maha Temple, Nanminda
 Kadambur Temple, Karakkunnath
 Nanjundeshwara Shiva Temple, Nanminda 13
 Narakassery temple, Nanminda
 Pallikkara Vishnu Sudharshana Temple, Balussery Mukku
 Kuniyil Narasimha Kshethram, Ambalapoyil, Nanminda
 Puthiyottumkandy Karinkaputhoyon kavu
 Nanmanda Central Juma Masjid
 Nanminda High School Nanminda
 Cheekilode AUP School
 Kolathur Govt. High School
 National ALP School

References

External links 
 

Kozhikode north